The lieutenant governor of New Mexico is an elected official in the state of New Mexico that ranks just below the governor of New Mexico. The lieutenant governor is the first person in the order of succession of New Mexico's executive branch, thus serving as governor in the event of the death, resignation, removal, impeachment, absence from the state, or incapacity due to illness of the governor of New Mexico. The lieutenant governor is elected on a ticket with the governor for a four-year term. This position was first filled by Ezequiel Cabeza De Baca on January 6, 1912, the year that New Mexico became a state.

The current lieutenant governor is Howie Morales, a member of the Democratic Party.

While governor and lieutenant governor are elected on the same ticket in the general election, the offices run separately in primary elections. The last lieutenant governor to succeed the governorship was Tom Bolack, following the resignation of Edwin L. Mechem on November 30, 1962. Ezequiel Cabeza De Baca is the only lieutenant governor to be elected as governor in a later term.

Previously, the New Mexico State Constitution did not allow for the nomination of a replacement for lieutenant governor after the governor's office was succeeded; this is the reason the Governor number is higher than the lieutenant governor. Section 16 of Article VI of the New Mexico State Constitution (added on November 4, 2008) gives the governor the power to nominate a replacement for lieutenant governor upon confirmation of the nominee by a majority of the New Mexico State Senate.

List of lieutenant governors of New Mexico 
Since admission into the Union, New Mexico has had 27 lieutenant governors, two of whom have served non-consecutive terms.

Notes

References

New Mexico